Mistaken identity is a claim of the actual innocence of a criminal defendant. 

Mistaken Identity may also refer to:

In music 
Mistaken Identity (Kim Carnes album), 1981, or its title song
Mistaken Identity (Donna Summer album), 1991
Mistaken Identity (Vernon Reid album), 1996
Mistaken Identity (Delta Goodrem album), 2004
"Mistaken Identity" (Delta Goodrem song), 2005, from the album of the same name
"Mistaken Identity", a song by Janis Ian from The Secret Life of J. Eddy Fink

In film and television 
 Mistaken Identity (1941 film), an American film
 Mistaken Identity (TV series), Philippine drama series
 "Mistaken Identity" / "Easy Peasy Rider", an Angry Beavers episode
 "Mistaken Identity" (The Fresh Prince of Bel-Air), a The Fresh Prince of Bel-Air episode
 Mistaken Identity (film), a 1996 Canadian thriller film

In literature 
Mistaken Identity, novel in the Rosato & Associates series
Mistaken Identity: Two Families, One Survivor, Unwavering Hope, a 2008 non-fiction book with multiple authors

See also
 Mistaken (disambiguation)